Andre Metzger (born 1960) is an American former wrestler. He competed at 62 and 68 kilograms in freestyle wrestling, where he racked up numerous medals from the World Championships and the World Cup, as well as championships from the Pan American Games. In college, Metzger was a two-time NCAA Division I National champion and a four-time All-American at the University of Oklahoma.

Career 
Having started wrestling as a high school freshman, Metzger was a state champion out of Cedar Springs High School in Cedar Springs, Michigan and was successful in folkstyle, freestyle and Greco-Roman styles. From 1979 to 1982, he became a two-time NCAA Division I National champion and a four-time All-American while at the University of Oklahoma, and in 1980, Metzger almost made the US Olympic Team before injuring his ankle and forfeiting the finale against fellow NCAA champion Steve Barrett, where he was leading. 

During his freestyle career, Metzger racked up numerous medals from the World Championships and the World Cup, as well as championships from the Pan American Games. He made a return in 2012 as a Greco-Roman wrestler, falling one match short from placing at the US Olympic Team Trials despite being 54 years of age.

In 2017, Metzger was inducted into the National Wrestling Hall of Fame as a Distinguished Member.

References 

Living people
1960 births
People from Texas
Pan American Games gold medalists for the United States
Pan American Games medalists in wrestling
Wrestlers at the 1979 Pan American Games
Wrestlers at the 1987 Pan American Games
Medalists at the 1979 Pan American Games
Medalists at the 1987 Pan American Games